Li Hongyang may refer to:
Li Hongyang (footballer), Chinese footballer.
Li Hongyang (rhythmic gymnast), Chinese rhythmic gymnast.